Albert Künzler (b. 9 February 1911 - d. April 1982) was a Swiss ice hockey player who competed in the 1936 Winter Olympics.

In 1936 he participated with the Swiss ice hockey team in the Winter Olympics tournament.

See also
List of Olympic men's ice hockey players for Switzerland

References

External links

1911 births
1982 deaths
Ice hockey players at the 1936 Winter Olympics
Olympic ice hockey players of Switzerland
People from Davos
Sportspeople from Graubünden
Swiss ice hockey goaltenders